John Carl Godina (born May 31, 1972) is an American shot putter, whose record includes three World Championship wins and two Olympic medals. He also competes in discus. Godina was born in Fort Sill, Oklahoma.

High school years
While attending Cheyenne Central High School in Cheyenne, Wyoming, Godina was a letterman in football and outdoor track and field. He was an All-State honoree, and an All-American in both sports.

College years and Olympic Games
At college level, competing for UCLA, he won three outdoor NCAA championship victories, two in discus and one in shot put. His 1995 NCAA Outdoor shot put title was a national record with a throw of 22.00 meters (72'2.25"). In 1995, he won his first World Championship title in shot put, adding additional titles in 1997, and 2001. In the same discipline, he finished second in the 1996 Olympics and third in the 2000 Olympics.  He also qualified to those same Olympics in the Discus, the first American to qualify in both since Bud Houser in 1924 and he finished 8th in the 2004 Olympics in the Shot Put.  He retired in 2009 after suffering through injuries at the 2008 Olympic Trials.

Godina is one of the most decorated shot putters in U.S. athletics history. His legacy compares well with Parry O'Brien, who won two Olympic gold medals (1952, 1956) and one silver medal (1960), placed fourth in the Tokyo Olympics in  1964, and broke the world record 17 times. He was coached by Art Venegas, widely regarded as one of the best coaches in the world and the only coach to have  athletes reach 73' with both the glide and rotational techniques in the shot put.

Godina was named to the Mt. SAC Relays Hall of Fame in 2010.  His coach Art Venegas was named to the Hall in 2011.  He was inducted into the UCLA Athletics Hall of Fame in 2005.

World Throws Center
John has a throwing academy in five different locations, two in California (Sacramento and San Ramon). The other three are located in Arizona (Phoenix, Mesa and Glendale).

Godina trains top international athletes like Vikas Gowda, Suzy Powell and Dan Taylor.

Achievements

References

External links
 John Godina's U.S. Olympic Team bio
 

1972 births
Living people
American male discus throwers
American male shot putters
Athletes (track and field) at the 1996 Summer Olympics
Athletes (track and field) at the 2000 Summer Olympics
Athletes (track and field) at the 2004 Summer Olympics
Olympic silver medalists for the United States in track and field
Olympic bronze medalists for the United States in track and field
People from Fort Sill, Oklahoma
Sportspeople from Cheyenne, Wyoming
Track and field athletes from Wyoming
Sportspeople from Mesa, Arizona
UCLA Bruins men's track and field athletes
World Athletics Championships medalists
Medalists at the 2000 Summer Olympics
Medalists at the 1996 Summer Olympics
Goodwill Games medalists in athletics
World Athletics Indoor Championships winners
World Athletics Championships winners
Competitors at the 1998 Goodwill Games
Competitors at the 2001 Goodwill Games